P. Gannavaram (Patha Gannavaram) is a village and mandal in Konaseema district in the state of Andhra Pradesh in India.

Patha Gannavaram consists of 18 sub-villages. As per constitution of India and Panchyati Raaj Act, Patha Gannavaram is administrated by a sarpanch (head of village) who is the elected representative of village.

Dokka Seethamma (or Sithamma, 1841–1909), who gained recognition by spending much of her life serving food for poor people and travellers, was from Patha Gannavaram.

See also
Nagullanka
Konaseema
L.Gannvaram
Dokka seethaama 
 Gannavaram (SC) (Assembly constituency)

References 

Villages in Konaseema district
Mandals in Konaseema district
Mandals in Andhra Pradesh